Jason Richard Swallen (May 1, 1903 -April 22, 1991) was an American botanist specializing in grasses.

Born in Alliance, Ohio, Swallen graduated from Ohio Wesleyan University (AB 1924) and Kansas State Agricultural College (MS 1925). He spent two summers at the Michigan University Biological Station, then in 1925, he started as a botanist at the US Department of Agriculture, serving under the USDA's chief agrostologist A. S. Hitchcock and after Hitchcock's sudden death in 1935, Agnes Chase.

Swallen practiced botany in California in 1927, and from the southwest United States to Yucatan, Mexico, in 1928, 1931 and 1932. In 1936, he published on the grasses of Honduras and Peten, Guatemala, and was promoted to associate botanist. From 1943 to 1945, he served in Brazil as agricultural production officer in the US Office of the Coordinator of Inter-American Affairs. In 1947, he became the curator of the Division of Grasses at the Smithsonian Institution and chaired the Botany Department from 1950 until his retirement in 1965. In retirement he lived in Florida, Maryland, and Ohio.

In 1954 he was awarded an honorary DSc degree by Ohio Wesleyan University.

With Leona Winifred Smith, whom he married on June 10, 1929, he had one daughter, Ester. He was married a second time, to Clara Bayne Brasel, a 1941 Graduate of George Washington University and a Secretary at the Smithsonian, on August 28, 1955.

The genus Swallenia for Eureka Valley Dune Grass, endemic to Inyo County, California, commemorates his name.

Notes

Agrostologists
1903 births
1991 deaths
American taxonomists
Botanists active in California
Botanists active in Central America
United States Department of Agriculture people
Smithsonian Institution people
20th-century American botanists